NGC 937 is a barred spiral galaxy located in the constellation Andromeda about 251 million light years from the Milky Way. It was discovered by the French astronomer Édouard Stephan in 1884.

See also 
 List of NGC objects (1–1000)

References

External links
 

Barred spiral galaxies
0937
Andromeda (constellation)
009480